Katrina Smith Taylor (born 23 April 1991) is a British épée fencer. Her club is Truro Fencing Club.

Smith Taylor finished 20th at the 2019 European Fencing Championships in Dusseldorf, Germany. In addition, she has competed for Great Britain at multiple World Cups and Satellites, winning two medals.

References

External links

British female épée fencers
1991 births
Living people